The 1974–75 Montreal Canadiens season was the 66th season in team history. The Montreal Canadiens were eliminated in the semi-finals against the Buffalo Sabres four games to two. Henri Richard would play his final season with the club.

Offseason
Frank Mahovlich left the Canadiens, signing with the Toronto Toros of the World Hockey Association (WHA). Jacques Laperriere retired, he and Scotty Bowman unable to get along. Ken Dryden returned to the club after his law articling.

Regular season
Henri Richard entered his 20th season with the Canadiens, but his health was failing. He played 16 games before fracturing his left ankle on November 13, 1974, in a game against Buffalo and did not play again until the spring.

Guy Lafleur had a break-out season, breaking the Canadiens' goal-scoring record of 50 goals held by Maurice Richard and Bernie Geoffrion. Lafleur finished with 53 goals and 119 points. Lafleur finally realized his potential despite a slow start to the season and missing 10 games in mid-season with an injury.

Final standings

Schedule and results

Player statistics

Regular season
Scoring

Goaltending

Playoffs
Scoring

Goaltending

Playoffs

The Canadiens' first round opponent was the Vancouver Canucks and the Canadiens won the series in five games to advance to the semi-finals against the Buffalo Sabres. The Sabres defeated the Canadiens in six games to advance to the Stanley Cup final. The Sabres' checkers were able to shut down the Canadiens' top scorers, while the Canadiens' checkers were not able to contain the Sabres' French Connection line.

Awards and records

Transactions
Following the 1975 playoffs, Henri Richard retired after 20 NHL seasons. Having been the Canadiens captain since 1971, he was succeeded in that post by Yvan Cournoyer.

Draft picks

NHL Draft

Farm teams

References
 
 Canadiens on Hockey Database
 Canadiens on NHL Reference

Montreal Canadiens seasons
Montreal Canadiens season, 1974-75
Norris Division champion seasons
Montreal